Nicușor is a Romanian male given name. Along with Nicolae, it is one of the Romanian versions of the name Nicholas.

Notable people with this name include:

 Andrei Nicușor Negru (born 1994), Romanian handball player
 Nicușor Bancu (born 1992), Romanian football player
 Nicușor Bănică (born 1984), Romanian football player
 Nicușor Dan (born 1969), Romanian activist
 Nicușor Eșanu (born 1954), Romanian sprint canoer
 Nicușor Fota (born 1996), Romanian football player

Romanian masculine given names